Henchir-Ed-Douamès is an archaeological site and locality in Tunisia, North Africa.

Henchir-Ed-Douamès is located at 36°24'44"N, 9°05'06E, 120 km southwest of Tunis in the Governorate of Béja, near Dougga.

History
The ruins have been identified as the remains of Uchi Maius a civitas of the province of Africa Proconsularis during the Roman Empire.

The city is a Numidian foundation of the 5th century BC.  Roman colonization begins after the defeat of Jugurtha in 103 BC., with the installation of veterans of Gaius Marius.  The city was granted the title of Roman colony in 230 by Sévère Alexandre, became the seat of a bishopric in the 5th century and remained active in the Vandal and Byzantine kingdoms.  In the same way, an Arab installation is attested there in the 9th–12th centuries.

Remains
The ruins have been surveyed being identified in 1882 and studied first by Charles Tissot, followed by René Cagnat in 1885. Alfred Merlin and Louis Poinssot published a major book at the beginning of the 20th century.  The site was then abandoned in favor of the more promising site of Dougga located not far away.

An agreement between the National Institute of Heritage and the University of Sassari allows to restart the work on the site from 1994 onwards.

The most prominent feature of the ruins is the amphitheater. but there are also several inscriptions of note. One such inscription in the ruins honors Constantine and calls him our restorer.
Other features include 
Arch of Severus Alexander (239)
Arch of Gordian III (241)
Forum
Temple dedicated to the Capitoline Triad
Paleo-Christian basilica
Baths recently excavated and dating from the first half of the 4th century
Amphitheater in the course of release but traditionally dated from the 3rd century

The city was also the seat of an ancient Christian bishopric, which survives today as a titular see of the Roman Catholic Church.

References

Archaeological sites in Tunisia
Roman towns and cities in Tunisia
Ancient Berber cities
Catholic titular sees in Africa